Mateus Rodrigues dos Santos (born 3 April 1999), commonly known as Mateus, is a Brazilian footballer who currently plays as a defender for Vitória.

Career statistics

Club

Notes

References

1999 births
Living people
Brazilian footballers
Association football defenders
Campeonato Brasileiro Série A players
Esporte Clube Vitória players
Sport Club Internacional players